State elections were held in South Australia on 15 September 1979. All 47 seats in the South Australian House of Assembly were up for election. The incumbent Australian Labor Party led by Premier of South Australia Des Corcoran was defeated by the Liberal Party of Australia led by Leader of the Opposition David Tonkin.

The Liberals originally won 25 seats, but a court decision overturned their win in Norwood. Labor won the Norwood by-election, which meant the Liberals held 24 seats, with Labor on 20 seats, and 1 each to the Australian Democrats, National Country Party, and an Independent Labor.

Background
Premier Don Dunstan abruptly resigned as premier on 15 February 1979, due to ill health, and was succeeded by Deputy Premier Des Corcoran. Dunstan also resigned from parliament, and his seat was retained for Labor by Greg Crafter at the by-election in March 1979.

Spurred by positive opinion polls, and seeking to escape the shadow of Dunstan by gaining a mandate of his own, Corcoran called a snap election, without informing the party apparatus. The election campaign was plagued by problems, which allowed an opening for the Liberals under Tonkin.  It did not help matters that The Advertiser was biased toward the Liberal campaign.

Summary of results

Labor suffered a large swing, losing seven seats (six to the Liberals, one to Independent Labor Norm Peterson).  The Liberals also won 55 percent of the two-party vote to Labor's 45 percent.  In most of Australia, this would have been enough for a landslide Liberal victory. However, the Liberals only won 13 seats in Adelaide, netting them a total of 25 seats, a bare majority of two.  Narrow as it was, it was the first time the main non-Labor party in South Australia had won the most seats while also winning a majority of the vote since the Liberal and Country League won 50.3 percent of the two-party vote in 1959.

The Liberal majority was pared back even further after the Court of Disputed Returns struck down the result in Norwood. The court found that a Liberal Party advertisement in an Italian language newspaper, which described Liberal candidate Frank Webster as "your representative" ("il vostro deputato"), gave the false impression that Webster was the sitting member. Labor regained Norwood at the 1980 Norwood state by-election, reducing the Liberals to 24 seats, just enough to govern.

In the South Australian Legislative Council, the Liberals won 6 seats, Labor won 4, and Australian Democrats won 1; giving numbers of 11 Liberal, 10 Labor and 1 Democrat, leaving the Liberal government one seat short of a majority.

Aftermath

Corcoran was bitter in defeat, believing sections of the ALP had undermined him during the campaign.  He resigned as leader soon after the election, and retired from politics in 1982.

In 1982, when legislation to enable the Roxby Downs uranium mine was opposed by both Labor and the Democrats, Norm Foster resigned from the Labor Party to support the legislation, and sat as an independent in the Legislative Council.

Key dates
 House of Assembly dissolved: 22 August 1979, 2:00pm
 Issue of writ: 27 August 1979
 Close of nominations: 5 September 1979
 Polling day: 15 September 1979
 Return of writ: On or before 5 October 1979

Results

House of Assembly
These numbers include the result of the 1980 Norwood state by-election.

|}

Seats changing hands

 Members in italics did not recontest their seats.
 Keith Russack was elected in 1977 as an Independent, but joined the Liberal party soon after.

Legislative Council

|}

Post-election pendulum
These numbers include the result of the 1980 Norwood state by-election.

Subsequently, the 1982 Mitcham by-election and 1982 Florey by-election were held. The Democrats retained Mitcham by 45 votes, while Labor increased their margin in Florey.

See also
 Results of the South Australian state election, 1979 (House of Assembly)
 Results of the 1979 South Australian state election (Legislative Council)
 Members of the South Australian House of Assembly, 1979-1982
 Members of the South Australian Legislative Council, 1979-1982

References
History of South Australian elections 1857-2006, volume 1: ECSA
Historical lower house results
Historical upper house results
State and federal election results  in Australia since 1890

Specific

Elections in South Australia
1979 elections in Australia
1970s in South Australia
September 1979 events in Australia